Ljubica Christina Vukicevic Demidov (born 18 June 1987) is a Norwegian former hurdler. She represented Ski IL, and was coached by her father Petar Vukićević, who participated for Yugoslavia in the 1980 Summer Olympics in Moscow. Her brother, Vladimir Vukicevic, is also a hurdler.

Her gold medal in the 2003 European Youth Summer Olympic Festival in Paris was her first international medal. She finished fifth at the 2004 World Junior Championships, and won a silver medal at the 2005 European Junior Championships in Kaunas. She was forced to take a prolonged break during the summer of 2005 due to a knee-injury and the following surgery. At the 2006 World Junior Championships she took the silver medal with the time 13.34 seconds, a national junior record. She made her senior global debut at the 2007 World Championships and ran a personal best of 13.07 seconds in the heats. Since 2004 she has been the Norwegian champion, last in 2008 with a time of 13.20 seconds.

She has later lowered her personal best time to 13.05 seconds, achieved during the 2008 Olympic Games in Beijing. On the 60 meter hurdles she has 8.03 seconds set on an international meeting in Düsseldorf 2008. She just missed out on the podium with a fourth-place finish at the 2009 European Indoor Championships. She won her first international gold medal at the 2009 European U23 Championships in Kaunas, with a time of 12.99 seconds. She lowered her best that year to 12.74, which she achieved in Hengelo. She competed at the 2009 World Championships in Athletics but she could not reach heights she had in Hengelo, and was knocked out in the semifinals after running 13.00 seconds.

She started the 2010 season by setting a new best in the 60 metres hurdles with a run of 7.94 seconds – a Norwegian record. She narrowly missed a place in the final at the 2010 IAAF World Indoor Championships. At the 2010 European Team Championships she won the bronze medal and came fourth at the 2010 European Athletics Championships later on, recording her season's best of 12.78 seconds in the final.

Her 2011 opened just as it had the previous year, with a national record over 60 m hurdles (7.92 seconds). She set her sights on a medal at the 2011 European Athletics Indoor Championships, hoping to go beyond her fourth place at the 2009 event. She improved her mark further to 7.90 seconds at the BW Bank Meeting in February.

She once dated Norwegian javelin thrower, Andreas Thorkildsen.

In November 2012 it was reported that she had been training with the controversial doctor Srdjan Djordjevic.

She is married to the Norwegian footballer, Vadim Demidov. On 29 February 2016, she revealed that she is expecting a child with Demidov and announced her retirement from professional sport, not having competed since 2012 due to an injury.

Personal bests

All information taken from IAAF profile.

References

External links
 

1987 births
Living people
Norwegian female hurdlers
Norwegian people of Serbian descent
People from Lørenskog
Olympic athletes of Norway
Athletes (track and field) at the 2008 Summer Olympics
Serb diaspora sportspeople
Sportspeople from Viken (county)
Association footballers' wives and girlfriends